Visages de femmes (Faces of Women), is a 1985 Ivorian comedy drama film directed and produced by Desiré Ecaré for Films de la Lagune. The film stars Albertine N'Guessan in the lead role whereas Sidiki Bakaba, Kouadou Brou, Eugénie Cissé-Roland and Véronique Mahilé made supportive roles. The film revolves around Mrs. Congas, who runs a fish-drying business in a coastal city and her struggle to survive with her two daughter amidst of males of the city.

The film made its premier on 26 June 1985 in France. The film received mixed reviews from critics and screened in many film festivals. The film was screened for the 24th International Critics' Week (24e Semaine de la Critique). Later, the film won the International Federation of Film Critics (FIPRESCI) Prize at the 1985 Cannes Film Festival. In the same year, the film was also nominated for the Golden Charybdis Award at the Taormina International Film Festival.

Cast
 Albertine N'Guessan as Mrs. Congas		
 Sidiki Bakaba as Koiassi
 Kouadou Brou as Brou
 Eugénie Cissé-Roland as Fish Seller
 Véronique Mahilé		
 Carmen Levry		
 Anny Brigitte		
 Alexis Leache		
 Victor Couzyn
 Fatou Fall		
 Traore Siriki		
 Désiré Bamba

References

External links 

Ivorian comedy films
1985 films
1985 drama films
Ivorian drama films